KACP (103.1 FM) is a radio station licensed to serve the community of Pahrump, Nevada. The station is owned by Shamrock Communications, Inc., and airs a country music format.

The station was assigned the KACP call letters by the Federal Communications Commission on July 14, 2014.

References

External links
 Official Website
 FCC Public Inspection File for KACP
 

ACP (FM)
Radio stations established in 2014
2014 establishments in Nevada
Country radio stations in the United States
Nye County, Nevada